Martina Hingis defeated Mary Pierce in the final, 6–2, 6–2 to win the women's singles tennis title at the 1997 Australian Open. She did not lose a set during the tournament. Hingis became the youngest woman (at the age of 16 years and three months) to win a major singles title since Lottie Dod at the 1887 Wimbledon Championships.

Monica Seles was the reigning champion, but did not compete that year.

Steffi Graf's 45-match major winning streak ended (dating to the 1995 French Open) when she was defeated by Amanda Coetzer in the fourth round.

Seeds

Qualifying

Draw

Finals

Top half

Section 1

Section 2

Section 3

Section 4

Bottom half

Section 5

Section 6

Section 7

Section 8

References

External links
 1997 Australian Open – Women's draws and results at the International Tennis Federation

Women's Singles
Australian Open (tennis) by year – Women's singles
1997 in Australian women's sport
1997 WTA Tour